Percy Bolton Haggitt (1878-1957) was the Dean of Nelson from 1934  until his death.

Haggitt was educated at the University of New Zealand and  ordained in 1903. His first posts were curacies in Christchurch. He was Vicar of St John St Albans in the same city from 1906 to 1911, and then St Mary, Merivale. He was Archdeacon of Christchurch from 1918 until his appointment as Dean.

References

1878 births
1957 deaths
Archdeacons of Christchurch
Deans of Nelson
University of New Zealand alumni